is a Japanese anime series and the fourth installment in Izumi Todo's Pretty Cure metaseries produced by Toei Animation, featuring the third generation of Cures. The series aired on TV Asahi between February 2007 and January 2008 and was followed by a sequel season, which made up the franchise's fifth installment and aired between February 2008 and January 2009. Both series were directed by Toshiaki Komura and written by Yoshimi Narita. The character designs were done by Toshie Kawamura, who would go on to work on the character designs for Smile PreCure! and Hug! Pretty Cure. The illustration book of her works was released on February 12, 2014. A manga adaptation was serialized in Kodansha's monthly Nakayoshi magazine. The series has made use of butterflies as the main motif whilst GoGo!'s main motif is roses.

Story

Yes! PreCure 5
The original series started broadcasting on February 4, 2007, and ended on January 27, 2008, in Japan. Nozomi Yumehara, a regular middle school student, finds a magical book called the Dream Collet in the library and meets Coco, a creature from the Palmier Kingdom. Nozomi decides to help restore Coco's world, which has been destroyed by an organization called Nightmare, by completing the Dream Collet and finding the 55 Pinkies to make any wish come true. By making her decision to help Coco, she proves she has the heart to be a Pretty Cure and is given her Pinky Catch from a pink butterfly letting her transform into Cure Dream. Meanwhile, the Nightmares are fighting the cures to steal the Dream Collet and defeat Pretty Cure. To help, she must choose a team of four other students to be Pretty Cure so that she may help protect the Dream Collet and save Nuts from his entrapment within. Together with Cure Rouge, Cure Lemonade, Cure Mint and Cure Aqua, they form the Pretty Cure Team.

Yes! PreCure 5 GoGo!
The next sequel Yes! PreCure 5 GoGo! started its run on February 3, 2008. The Cure Rose Garden has always been concealed from human eye. Flora, the area's guardian, watches over it and ensures that the path to the secret area doesn't appear. However Eternal, an art organization known for amassing treasure and artwork from many worlds, is trying to get to the garden. To do this, they first invade the Palmier Kingdom and four other kingdoms. Flora senses the approaching a danger and sends a letter to the Pretty Cures. Their new mission is to find the four rulers that have fled from their kingdoms since they hold the Rose Garden Keys. To perform this mission, Nozomi and the others regain their ability to transform into PreCure Five. Yes! PreCure 5 GoGo! features the debut of Milk's human form, Kurumi Mimino and her Pretty Cure ego, Milky Rose.

Characters

Pretty Cures
 

A 14/15-year-old second-year student at L'École des Cinq Lumières Institute, Nozomi appears to be a typical shōjo heroine, and does not know what to do with her life. She has no special talent like the other members of PreCure and is clumsy, easily distracted and carefree to a fault, but her cheerful and optimistic demeanor earns her the respect of others. She has a habit of saying "" when she decides on something. She becomes a Pretty Cure in order to fulfill the promise of Coco's dream, and in turn creates a special bond with him. Her theme color is pink. Her transformation line is, ""

 

This 14/15-year-old second-year student appears as a tomboy and plays enough sports to have every team clamouring for her to join them, but indulges in a few feminine pursuits, such as a love of boys and is scared of ghosts and legends. She has a very straightforward and down-to-earth personality that sharply contrasts with her childhood friend and classmate, Nozomi. Her parents run a flower shop called Natsuki Florist (Fleurist Natsuki), making her busy due to helping out her parents and nursing her younger sister and brother. She felt in question for her future at first, but getting interest in jewelry design after working in Nuts House. Her theme color is red. Her transformation line is, ""

 

Urara is in the first-year and the youngest member. She is a 13/14-year-old sweet, blonde first-year and a transfer student. Urara's personality may be the same as Nozomi as well. She is half Japanese and half French. She wants to inherit the dream of her mother, who was a famous actress before passing away, so she engages in the entertainment career. Owing to these complex reasons, she has a mature and realistic personality, leaving her few friends around her. She has a special bond with Syrup, similar to that of Nozomi and Coco, Komachi and Nuts, and Karen and Milk. Her theme color is yellow. Her transformation line is, ""

 

In the third-year, 15/16-year-old Komachi is kind and shy, and likes to read books and write. However, once she is angered enough, she will snap and release her temper. She is a volunteer at the school library, along with Karen/Cure Aqua, and often spends her time there writing stories. Her dream is to become a writer. She has a special bond with Nuts, that develop into romantic feelings. Her parents own a traditional Japanese sweetshop. She becomes a Pretty Cure when she acknowledges with Nozomi's thought. Her theme color is green. Her transformation line is, ""

 

Karen is Komachi's 15/16-year-old classmate and best friend, comes from an affluent family and is a member of the student council. Her parents are musicians and often go on tour. She misses them, but will not ask for them to come home for fear of disturbing their work, so despite wealth and popularity, she is often lonely. Seen around school as cool and inspiring, most of the students look up to her. In the beginning, she is reluctant to join the Cure team. In episode 6, as the girls are being manhandled, Karen stands up for her friends, vowing to protect them regardless of transformation. The butterfly that eluded her previously reappears and successfully lands on her wrist, enabling her to transform to Cure Aqua. Like Nozomi and Komachi with Coco and Nuts respectively, she has a special bond with Milk. Her theme color is blue. Her transformation line is, ""

Mascots
 / 

One of the mascot creatures from the Palmier Kingdom, Coco is a yellow-furred tail fox searching for the Dream Collet to restore his kingdom. He can transform into a human, and later becomes a teacher at Nozomi's school to keep watch of her. Coco has expressed that he has strong feelings for Nozomi, but is hesitant to act on them because of the knowledge that they will have to go their separate ways as soon as his kingdom is restored. They kissed in Yes! Pretty Cure 5 GoGo!: Okashi no Kuni no Happy Birthday!.  Fittingly, his human name "Kokoda" sounds like the way one would say "I'm Coco" in Japanese. Halfway through the series, it is revealed that he and Nuts are actually princes from separate parts of the Palmier Kingdom.

He is given Palmier's crown in episode 24 of Yes! PreCure 5 GoGo, allowing PreCure 5 to use Cure Fleur. Both he and Nuts combine powers in GoGo episode 38 to allow Cure Dream and Milky Rose to combine powers.

 / 

The other creature from the Palmier Kingdom, Nuts is a brown squirrel that can transform into a human, the clerk of a jewelry shop called Natts House. In the beginning of the series, he is sealed within the Dream Collet and was freed after the 5 Cures received their powers. Coco describes him as a good friend, comparable to the relationship between Nozomi and Rin. In Episode 7 Natts is released from the Dream Collet and is revealed to have an aloof, somewhat cold personality. Because of the events of his past he has difficulty trusting anyone, and did not trust Coco at first. His human form is so good looking that it causes the other Pretty Cure girls to blush, as well as most other girls who see him. Komachi exhibits romantic feelings for Nuts, and though his stoicism does not make him an easy character to read, it is made clear that he feels a special bond with Komachi. Some episodes of the series, as well as a set of character cards, give his human name as "Natts"; however, this is generally accepted as Engrish.

He is given Palmier's crown in episode 31 of Yes! PreCure 5 GoGo, allowing Milky Rose to use the Milky Mirror. Both he and Coco combine powers in GoGo episode 38 to allow Cure Dream and Milky Rose to combine powers.

   

Debuts in episode 21. A white-and-pink lop rabbit who is the royal speaker and chancellor-to-be of the Palmier Kingdom. Milk has long, violet, curly hair and fuchsia eyes. She dresses in violet with blue flower decorations. Over the series Milk and Karen develop a close friendship, beginning when Karen sacrifices herself to protect her. Milk also greatly admires Coco, and is jealous when Nozomi grows closer to him.
She doesn't have a natural ability to take a human form like the princes do, but later gained it after picking up a glowing blue seed in the sequel Yes! PreCure 5 GoGo!. At first, she enrolls into Nozomi's class and acts as a mysterious, calm, smart, cool persona to cover her bizarre personality from the princes and Pretty Cures. However, her secret was eventually blown due to that she can't maintain the form after battles. 
After gaining the human form, Milk is also able to transform into the Pretty Cure heroine, Milky Rose. She introduces herself as  Her theme color is purple.

 / 

Debuts in episode 1 of the sequel. A tan feathered, bird-like mascot that can turn to human form and take on an aerial transport form when necessary. He is slightly arrogant and a delivery-boy. Syrup once worked for Eternal, the villains of the sequel, because he was looking for something in the Cure Rose Garden and needed to get there. He quit for reasons currently unknown. When Syrup was younger, he worked in the Cure Rose Garden. In Eternal, he was asked to deliver a letter from Eternal's boss to Flora. Syrup has amnesia and forgot who he was, and wanted to find the Cure Rose Garden so he can regain his memories. He develops a bond with Urara like the ones between Nozomi and Coco, Komachi and Nuts and Karen and Milk.

A walking pink rabbit that works with Syrup. He helps with sending and receiving letters. In last episode, it is said that he is the red rose that Syrup planted in Cure Rose Garden. He just disguises himself as a mailbox so he can be with Syrup all the time.

Villains

Nightmare
 is an evil organization and main villains of the first series who are after the Dream Collet to wish to bring it to bring despair to the world.

The head of the Nightmare and the main antagonist of the first series. She intends to gain eternal life to bring despair to all the world, and has ordered her subordinates to obtain the Dream Collet. Her name appears to play off of the words "pariah" and "despair".. She has long brown hair and wears a purple dress and a mask.

Desparaia's secretary. He conveys her intentions and orders to other Nightmares, and report to her on the missions. Most of the other Nightmares fear him. He is modeled after a chameleon and often uses his mimicking ability to deceive others. His name is a play on the Japanese word kawaru, which means change.

The boss of Girinma, Gamao and Arachnea. He transforms into a bee. For the first part of the series he was believed to be leading the Nightmares, but it is soon revealed that he takes orders from Kawarino. He joined Eternal in the sequel after surviving a fatal fall near the end of the prequel.

The first member of Nightmare to appear. He can transform into a deadly praying mantis with arms that slice. He greatly fears his superiors, and is often threatened by Bunbee. In his human form, he wears a hat and holds a cane.

A large man that resembles a hobo. He is seen to be extremely lazy and often refuses to do any work, even if his survival and duty as a Nightmare depend on it. He transforms into a toad. His name is from the Japanese "gama", meaning toad. In his human form he looks very fat.

The lone woman of the team, she resembles Poisony from Futari Wa. She transforms into a spider. Many episodes featuring her have her pulling the girls into the sewers to fight, for reasons unknown. Her name is based on the Greek "arachne" (spider). In her human form she has short light purple hair and wears a red office dress.

One of the villains appearing in the second part of the season. She can transform into a chicken, very colorful costume reminiscent of Brazil Carnival. She likes to take what she wants and often lets Bunbee serve her in some way. In her human form she is very fat and wears a red jacket and blue pants; she also wears jewelry.

The last Nightmare member showing up in the first season. Bloody can transform into a bat, shooting sonic waves at his enemies. In the first place, however, he tries to win by persuasion and talking, only using Kowaina to help him. He always uses rooms or places to transform into Kowaina rather than objects.

A catastrophic entity and a mask that can be inserted into any inanimate object, causing it to "come alive" and cause destruction. The villains often use it as both an offense and a defense to add more helpers onto their side during the battle. The name is a pun off of the Japanese adjective, kowai, which means "frightening."

Eternal
 is an evil art organization and main villains of "GoGo!" who steal art and treasure, and are searching for the Cure Rose Garden.

The ruler of the Eternal and the main antagonist of the sequel, he appears to be a silver-masked man wearing a robe and frequently seen at the office of the Eternal Museum. He was responsible for the destruction of the four kingdoms of Palmier and attempts to go to the Cure Rose Garden to make all life eternal.

She is a middle age woman with purple hair resembling a medusa's. She's also the kind of an administrator among Eternal, always telling her members what they should do and controlling rare objects they bring her. She also always claims report papers from her members and is very strict to them. In fact she seems to be doing all that only for the boss of Eternal, the director. As of episode 46, her true form is revealed.

Scorp is the first member of  Eternal to be shown in the series. He seems to know a lot about Syrup and his circumstances. When coming to fight, he transforms into a scorpion. Although they do not get along too well at first, he gradually becomes kind of friends with Bunbee. His last episode was episode 11. He's also the final boss of the game, gained the ability to transform into a giant scorpion-like monster.

This guy is the third member of Eternal (not counting Bunbee as one). He transforms into an octopus, the Japanese word "tako" in his name stands for this. He does not like rules very much and thus often argues with Anacondy about his reports. His last episode was episode 24.

Eternal's "nightmare-duo", the group's best hunters there. The small and fat Yadokhan mainly does the talking, although he is also very short of words, with the tall Isohgin repeating what Yadohkan says. The two can transform into a hermit crab/sea anemone monster. Their last episode was in episode 38.

This old woman wearing kind of a mushroom on her head manipulates fairy tales (European and also Japanese ones) to fight Precure. To do so, she pulls the girls into the world of the fairy tales where she can find ideal material to create a Hoshiina. She does not like Anacondy very much. Her last episode was episode 42.

The currently newest member of Eternal is an extremely good-looking guy. He uses his good looks to approach Precure and find out something about them. His true form is revealed as of episode 41, and resembles a cockroach.

The Hoshiina are monsters in the new season that are called forth by throwing a yellow ball onto objects. The name is from hoshii, which means "to want or desire".

Cure Rose Garden

Mysterious lady who guards the Cure Rose Garden. She has long pink hair with a tiara adorning her head. The boss of Eternal is interested in her. In the last episode, she told Syrup that she wanted him to be friends with the Cures and that's why she asked him to send that letter to Nozomi in the first episode.

Four Rulers
In the sequel, the Kings and Queens of four Kingdoms hold the Rose Garden Keys. For this, Eternal attacks their Kingdoms and they flee. Once a ruler is found, he or she must stay in the Rose Pact for a certain amount of time to recover. After which, they can go back and restore the Kingdom destroyed. Each have a special power that benefits themselves and the team, and the rulers can communicate with their crowns. Together, all four open the door to the Cure Rose Garden.

The first ruler to be found. He is a small blue dragon, he is the ruler of the Doughnut Kingdom, which is east of Palmier. Dignified, he is smart and arrogant. He appreciates people who work hard for others. Should he be attacked, he will stun the enemy with a blue light emitting from his hands. The King leaves in episode 14, but not before giving a calling card.

The second ruler holding a Rose Garden Key. She is a pink-and-red colored bird, the Queen of the Bavarois Kingdom, which is south of Palmier. Sociable and energetic, but very talkative to the point of causing problems for others. Her power allows communication between PreCure 5 by making their transformation items act as a mobile phone. In episode 25, she gives her calling card and goes back to her kingdom.

The third ruler with a Rose Garden Key. She is a lemon chiffon orange striped tiger. Is in love with Coco and claims to be his fiancee. Her kingdom, the Crêpe Kingdom, is west of Palmier. She hopes that her marriage to Coco will unify both kingdoms. Crepe's power activates the Milky Note, a laptop. Crepe leaves in episode 34, remaining friends with Coco after he rejects her confession, and giving her calling card.

The fourth and last ruler known with a key. He is a green and tan turtle, the ruler of the Mont Blanc Kingdom, which is to the north of Palmier. Eldest of all four rulers, he is also the most intelligent, as he knows about the connection between Flora and Syrup. He also may know the connection between Eternal and the Cure Rose Garden.

Cures' families

Nozomi's mother. She is a beautician and runs a beauty shop Espoir (French for hope). She and Kazuyo are childhood friends just like Nozomi and Rin. Kazuyo says that she had been a more blunderer than Nozomi.

Nozomi’s father. He is a children’s artist. He is very friendly, but is also a little unworldly.

Rin's mother. She and her husband run a flower shop "Fleuriste Natsuki". She is called "Kazu-chan" by Megumi like Rin-chan by Nozomi.

 and 

Rin's younger twin siblings. Yu is a boy and Ai is a girl. They are so naughty that they always trouble Rin.

Urara’s late mother and Michel’s late wife. She was a stage actress and died when Urara was very little.

Urara’s father and Maria’s husband. He is French but lives in Japan for 20 years.

Urara’s grandfather and Maria’s father. He is quite old but is very active.

Komachi’s older sister. She is a biker and goes to college, likes to travel and is hardly ever at home.

He is the Minazuki's butler and takes care of Karen when her parents aren't home. He is very respectful to her and calls her 'ojou-sama' ("young lady"), but he also seems to be fond of her, like a father.

L'École des Cinq Lumières
 is the junior high school the Cures attend.

The captain of football club. Appears in episode 13 with the football club. Kaori's is the goodfriend of Miho.

Three members of the football club.

A second-year student who is the chief editor of the Cinq Lumières Tsūshin (a school paper). She tends to appropriate the paper for herself a little. Her name is a pun of masukomi (mass communication/media). Mika gets close to getting her "scoop" on the Pretty Cures, but is always distracted by Nuts' human form, making the next day's paper all about him and her and reducing the article on the Cures to a small, almost unreadable size.

A close friend of Urara.

 and 

Fictionalized versions of the above two who appear as performers in a stage play.

The mistress of the cafeteria in girls' school where they always eat lunch, rather like the Tako Café in Pretty Cure Max Heart. She is a cheerful, middle-aged woman who sometimes gives them good advice. In truth, she is also the secret principal of the school. She use double identitis due to that she wants to receive advices directly from students like her earlier time as an intern teacher.

Media

Television series

Both series were directed by Toshiaki Komura. Yes! PreCure 5 in Japan on Asahi Broadcasting Corporation and other ANN stations between February 4, 2007 and January 27, 2008. GoGo! aired between February 3, 2008 to January 25, 2009. Both series has four pieces of theme music: two opening and two ending themes.

The opening theme for Yes! PreCure 5 is  performed by Mayu Kudo with the chorus performed by Young Fresh with Mayumi Gojo. The first 32 episodes' ending theme is  performed by Kanako Miyamoto. This song was also used as the theme for the film adaptation Great Miraculous Adventure in the Mirror Kingdom!. An insert song in the series titled  was performed by Mariya Ise as her character Urara Kasugano and was used in episodes 20 and 29.

The first ending theme, used for the first 29 episodes, is  performed by Miyamoto with Young Fresh. The second ending  was used for the remaining 19 episodes of the series, and performed by the Cure Quartet, comprising Ise, Uechiyae, Kudou, and Miyamoto. Two insert songs were also used in the series, the first being  by Ise as Urara Kasugano in episodes 18 and 37, and the other  by the Cure Quartet, sung right before the ending theme played on episode 48.

Films
 premiered on theaters on November 10, 2007. 

 also premiered on theaters on November 8, 2008. 

Manga
Manga adaptations of both series were illustrated by Futago Kamikita and published in Kodansha's Nakayoshi magazine.

Video game
There are two video games, was released by Bandai for the Nintendo DS on November 29, 2007. , was also released by Bandai for the Nintendo DS on October 30, 2008, also featuring characters from Futari wa Pretty Cure and Futari wa Pretty Cure Splash Star. The opening theme is

References

External links
 Toei Animation's Yes! Precure 5 site
 Toei Animation's Yes! Precure 5 GoGo! site
 ABC's Yes! Precure 5 site 
 ABC's Yes! Precure 5 GoGo! site 
 Yes! PreCure 5 movie: Kagami no Kuni no Miracle Daibōken! 
 Yes! PreCure 5 GoGo movie: Okashi no Kuni no Happy Birthday 
 Bandai Namco's Precure Dream Live Official Website 
 
 

2008 Japanese television series endings
2009 Japanese television series endings
2007 anime films
2007 manga
2008 comics endings
2008 anime films
2008 manga
2009 comics endings
Anime series
Films directed by Tatsuya Nagamine
Manga series
Magical girl anime and manga
Pretty Cure
TV Asahi original programming
Toei Animation television
Toei Animation films